Bazex syndrome may refer to:
 Bazex–Dupré–Christol syndrome
 Acrokeratosis paraneoplastica of Bazex

Conditions of the skin appendages
Genodermatoses